Bimbo's Express is a 1931 Fleischer Studios Talkartoon animated short film starring Bimbo and Betty Boop.

Synopsis
Bimbo shows up at Betty's door with his assistants to help Betty move from her house. Bimbo takes one glance at Betty, and falls in love with her. Bimbo then sings "Hello Beautiful" to Betty in Maurice Chevalier's voice. They then load up the moving van with all of her belongings (even the stairs) and Betty sits up into the driver's seat with Bimbo. She then moves "around the corner".

References

External links
Bimbos Express at IMDB
Bimbos Express at the Cartoon Database

1931 films
Betty Boop cartoons
1930s American animated films
American black-and-white films
1931 animated films
Paramount Pictures short films
Fleischer Studios short films
Short films directed by Dave Fleischer
Cultural depictions of Maurice Chevalier